The Hennessey Venom GT is a limited-production high performance sports car manufactured by US manufacturer Hennessey Performance Engineering. The Venom GT is based on the Lotus Elise/Exige.

Speed records
In addition, the car set an unofficial record for  acceleration at 14.51 seconds, beating the Koenigsegg Agera R's time of 17.68 seconds, making it the unofficial fastest accelerating road legal car in the world.

On April 3, 2013, the Hennessey Venom GT crested  over the course of  during testing at United States Naval Air Station Lemoore in Lemoore, California. Hennessey used two VBOX 3i data logging systems to document the run and had VBOX officials on hand to certify the numbers.

As the run was in a single direction, and only 29 cars were produced (to qualify for Guinness World Records a minimum of 30 cars are required to be produced), it does not qualify as the world's fastest production car in the Guinness Book of Records.

As with previous speed tests, the run was independently verified by Racelogic as World Fastest road legal open-top sports car. In May, 2016, the Hennessey Team revealed that the car was about  down on power due to issues with one of the car's three high capacity fuel pumps.

Specifications

Chassis
The Venom GT utilizes a heavily modified Lotus Elise/Exige chassis. The manufacturer states that the modified chassis uses components from the Lotus Exige, including the roof, doors, side glass, windscreen, cockpit, floorpan, HVAC system, wiper and head lamps, though the manufacturer is not associated with Lotus Cars. For road use, the car is registered as a Lotus Exige (modified) and is not a series production car.

The Venom GT has a curb weight of  aided by carbon fiber bodywork and carbon fiber wheels. The brakes have Brembo 6-piston calipers at the front and 4-piston calipers at the rear. The rotors are  carbon ceramic units provided by Surface Transforms.

Drivetrain

The Venom GT is powered by a twin-turbocharged  GM LS7 V8 engine. The LS9 architecture incorporates specific design features such as reinforced internal components and additional head bolts with aluminum heads including twin Precision dual ball bearing turbochargers. The engine has a redline of 7,200 rpm.

The mid-mounted engine is mated to the rear wheels with a Ricardo 6-speed manual transmission, which also had a previous application in the Ford GT.

A programmable traction control system manages power output. Computational fluid dynamics tested bodywork and downforce also help keep the car stable. Under varying conditions on both the road and racetrack, an active aero system with adjustable rear wing will deploy. An adjustable suspension system allows ride height adjustments by  according to speed and driving conditions. The car is fitted with Michelin Pilot Sport 2 tires

Venom GT Spyder
The Venom GT Spyder is an open top version of the Venom GT. Having decided to order a Venom GT, Aerosmith lead singer Steven Tyler approached Hennessey in mid-late 2011 and asked if an open-top version could be created. This involved structural changes which added  to the curb weight. Tyler's was the first of five cars scheduled for the 2013 model year.

The production of the Spyder was limited to five units with a one-off Spyder being produced as the "Final edition" model bringing the total to 6 units.

Venom GT "World's Fastest Edition" (2014)
The Venom GT "World's Fastest Edition" is a version of the Venom GT coupe limited to 3 units. The model commemorates the Venom GT coupe's 0–300 km/h Guinness World Record.

All three units were sold to customers shortly after their production was announced by the manufacturer.

Venom GT "Final Edition" (2017)
A single unit of the Venom GT Spyder, called the Final Edition was produced to commemorate the car's six year production run and to mark an end to the production of the Venom GT. The livery of the car is a "Glacier Blue" paint job with double narrow white stripes. The vehicle was pre-sold for  before its public debut.

Successor
The Hennessey Venom GT is succeeded by the Hennessey Venom F5, which was unveiled in November 2017; unlike its predecessor, it is a series production car built completely from the ground up, including chassis and engine.

In popular culture 
The Venom GT appears in video games Driveclub, Forza (series), Need for Speed: The Run, Need for Speed Rivals, Need for Speed: Most Wanted (2012 video game) and Asphalt 8: Airborne.

References

External links
 Hennessey Venom GT official Hennessey site

Cars of the United States
Rear mid-engine, rear-wheel-drive vehicles
Cars introduced in 2010
Roadsters
Hennessey vehicles